This is a list of Ottoman domes. The Ottomans were one of the main builders in the history of architecture to use the potential of domes for the creation of large and well-defined interior spaces. Domes were introduced in a number of Ottoman building types such as mosquess, madrasas, türbes. The largest domes were built for mosques. The large dome combined with slender minarets resulted in the famous silhouette of a typical Ottoman city.

Monumental domes began to appear in the 14th century in the Ottoman capital Bursa, in the 15th century in Edirne and after the conquest of Constantinople in Istanbul. Monumental domes were also built across the provinces in the Ottoman Empire. Along with the minaret the dome is one of the most important elements of an Ottoman mosque.

Domes

See also 
List of world's largest domes
Ottoman architecture

References 

Domes
Domes